Zoobombs is a Japanese indie rock band, formed in Tokyo in 1994 by vocalist and guitarist Don Matsuo.

History
The band formed in Tokyo in 1994, self-releasing four cassette albums. In 1999, the group signed to Virgin/EMI Japan where they released three albums. That year the band performed in Toronto as part of the Neon Palm Festival.

In 2013, the bassist in the group Moostop announced his desire to leave the group. Vocalist Don Matsuo stated that "I wasn’t really surprised, and knew that maybe this would happen one day, but I still wasn’t happy about his decision." The group did a tour and recorded a tour-only EP together. During this tour, the groups' drummer Pitt also announced his departure. Don Matuso and his wife Matta began focus on a new group called The Randolf after this tour.

18 months after the group announced their departure, Matsuo reformed the group with Bukka Billy as their new drummer with a touring bass player.

Style and influences
The band's funk-rock style is influenced by acts such as the Rolling Stones, Jimi Hendrix and Miles Davis.

Members
Current members
 Don Matsuo – vocals, guitar
 Matta – vocals, keyboards
 Bukka Billy – drums
 Mutch – bass guitar (supporting member)

Former members
 Moostop – bass guitar
 Atsushi – drums
 Piro – percussion
 Pocky – drums
 Kim – drums
 Pitt – drums

Discography

Studio albums
 Super Funcy of Zbons (1997)
 Welcome Back Zoobombs! (1997)
 Let It Bomb (1998)
 Bomb Freak Express (1999)
 Dirty Bomb (2000)
 Love Is Funky (2002)
 New San Francisco (2004)
 Vamos a Bailar (2005)
 BBB (2006)
 The Sweet Passion (2012)
 Ice Cream & Dirt (2016)

Compilation albums
 Way In / Way Out (2006)
 Nightfriend of Zoobombs (2009)
 La Vie En Jupon (2011)

Live albums
 Bomb You Live (2001)
 Bear's Banquet: Live from Deep Night in Toronto (2007)

EPs
 Zoobombcrazy (2006)
 Midnightfriend of Zoobombs (2010)
 Agitation (2011)
 Cowboy Trumps (2012)
 On the Jungle (2013)
 Dirty Present (2015)

Singles
 "Bomb the Bomb" (1998)
 "Mo' Funky" (1998)
 "Hot Love" (1999)
 "Doo-Bee" (2000)
 "Jumbo" (2001)
 "Funky Movin'" (2002)
 "Colombie" (2005)
 "Pisces" (2005)

References

External links

 
 
 

Japanese indie rock groups
Japanese alternative rock groups
Musical groups from Tokyo